Gregory Paul Landry (born December 18, 1946) is an American former professional football player who was a quarterback in the National Football League (NFL) from 1968 to 1981, and again in 1984. He played for the Detroit Lions, Baltimore Colts and Chicago Bears.  He played college football at Massachusetts from 1965–1967. He became an assistant coach after his playing career.

Playing career
Landry was the first quarterback selected in the first round (11th overall) of the 1968 NFL Draft after a stellar career at the University of Massachusetts where he was selected All-Yankee Conference for two seasons. In 1971, as a member of the Lions, he passed for 2,237 yards and 16 touchdowns and was named to his only Pro Bowl that year. In 1976, Landry passed for 2,191 yards and 17 touchdowns and was named the NFL's Comeback Player of the Year. He established a couple of passing records with the Lions. He was benched by Lions head coach Tommy Hudspeth late in the 1977 season and supplanted by Gary Danielson as the starting quarterback the following year.

Landry's request to be traded was granted when he was acquired by the Colts from the Lions for fourth- and fifth-round selections in 1979 (88th and 131st overall–Ulysses Norris and Pittsburgh center Walt Brown respectively) and a 1980 third-round pick (62nd overall–Mike Friede) on April 29, 1979. During his three seasons with the Colts, he played brilliantly in 1979 despite a 5–11 record after a season-ending injury to starting quarterback Bert Jones. He passed for a career best 2,932 yards and 15 touchdowns that season. He then played for George Allen on the Chicago Blitz and Arizona Wranglers in the United States Football League (USFL) in 1983 and 1984. He started one game as an emergency quarterback for the Chicago Bears in 1984 before retiring as a player.

Landry was also notable as a rusher, in addition to his passing. In a 1970 game against the Green Bay Packers, he managed to run for 76 yards on a quarterback sneak, which was for a time the longest rush by a quarterback in NFL history. He rushed for over 2,600 yards and 21 touchdowns in his career, exceeding 500 yards on the ground in both 1971 and 1972, as well as averaging ten yards per carry in 1970 and scoring 9 touchdowns in 1972.  He currently ranks third on the all-time Lions career passing yardage list (12,451), and ranks second in touchdown passes with 80.

Coaching career
Landry began his coaching career in 1985 handling the Cleveland Browns quarterbacks, and later joined Mike Ditka's staff as quarterback coach in 1986, following the Bears' rout of the New England Patriots in Super Bowl XX. With the Bears, he was also the wide receivers and tight ends coach before taking over as offensive coordinator from 1988 to 1992.

Following the 1992 season, Landry was hired as the offensive coordinator at the University of Illinois at Urbana–Champaign for two seasons. The  1994 Illinois Fighting Illini had the second-best passing offense in the Big Ten Conference, which carried the team to a 30–0 win in the Liberty Bowl over East Carolina, which was making its first bowl appearance in 16 seasons.

The following year, Landry returned to the Lions as quarterback coach, helping them to become the top offensive unit in the NFL and guiding Scott Mitchell to record-setting passing numbers that season. He retired from coaching after the 1996 season to become a local radio host.

Honors
In 2012, Landry was inducted into the National Polish-American Sports Hall of Fame.

References

External links
 

1946 births
Living people
American people of Polish descent
Sportspeople from Nashua, New Hampshire
Players of American football from New Hampshire
American football quarterbacks
UMass Minutemen football players
Detroit Lions players
Baltimore Colts players
Chicago Blitz players
Arizona Wranglers players
Chicago Bears players
National Conference Pro Bowl players
Coaches of American football from New Hampshire
Cleveland Browns coaches
Chicago Bears coaches
Illinois Fighting Illini football coaches
Detroit Lions coaches